Paul Trimmel is the eponymous hero of a series of detective novels by Friedhelm Werremeier. He was popularized in the television series Tatort and portrayed by Walter Richter.
Paul Trimmel is often compared to Georges Simenon's Jules Maigret.

Novels
The character appeared in the following novels:

 Ich verkaufe mich exklusiv (1968)
 Taxi nach Leipzig (1970)
 Der Richter in Weiß (1971)
 Ohne Landeerlaubnis (1971)
 Ein EKG für Trimmel (1972)
 Platzverweis für Trimmel (1972)
 Trimmel macht ein Faß auf (1973)
 Trimmel und der Tulpendieb (1974)
 Treff mit Trimmel, Erzählband (1974)
 Hände hoch, Herr Trimmel (1976)
 Trimmel hält ein Plädoyer (1976)
 Trimmel hat Angst vor dem Mond, Erzählband (1977)
 Trimmel und Isolde (1980)
 Trimmel und das Finanzamt (1982)
 Trimmel spielt auf Zeit
 Trimmel und der seltsame Zwischenfall
 Trimmel im Netz der Spinne
 Trimmel macht weiter
 Trimmel und der Graf

References

Fictional detectives
German fiction